Adrian Louis Castro Alandy (born February 7, 1980), formerly known as Luis Alandy, is a Filipino actor and model. His first acting role was as David in the TV series Pangako Sa 'Yo.

Biography
Alandy completed an intensive course in computer at AMA Computer University-East Rizal, in the Philippines. He then studied psychology at San Sebastian College, but dropped out in his third year to follow a career as an actor.

Alandy started out as a GMA Network artist, before transferring to ABS-CBN. He has since appeared in several soap operas, as well as in theater, appearing in the stage musical All About Men, in which he was naked on stage. After this he began showing more skin in his work, as well as playing gay roles on screen.

He has appeared in several TV series in the Philippines, including Sana'y Wala Nang Wakas (2003), Vietnam Rose (2005) and Gulong ng Palad (2006). He has also starred in a number of hit movies like Pacquiao: The Movie (2006) and Barcelona (2006). Alandy has appeared in Bench underwear fashion shows, and the musical revue Penis Talks (2004). He is also a member of the all-male macho group Barako Boys, alongside Jay Manalo and Christian Vasquez, which has released an album.

He subsequently returned from ABS-CBN to GMA Network, appearing in two primetime shows, Dyesebel and Luna Mystika. He then starred in the action thriller Sine Novela: Ngayon at Kailanman, playing a villain. In 2015, Alandy played David Limjoco in the lesbian TV series The Rich Man's Daughter.

In 2016, he moved back to ABS-CBN. He portrayed the character of Chad in the daytime series The Greatest Love. In 2018, his final appearance on ABS-CBN was Asintado as a special participation. He then returned to GMA Network alongside Wendell Ramos and Nora Aunor. Following his return to GMA, He changed his on-screen name from Luis Alandy to Adrian Alandy, his original name, to avoid confusion with his cousin, Cavite Rep. Luis "Jonjon" Alandy Ferrer IV.

In 2018, he returned to ABS-CBN in the role of 'Carlos' in the afternoon series Kadenang Ginto, alongside Dimples Romana and Albert Martinez.

Personal life
He married Joselle Fernandez on February 17, 2017, in Tagaytay.

Filmography

Television

Film

Awards and nominations

References

External links

1980 births
Living people
Filipino male film actors
Filipino male television actors
Filipino male models
Male actors from Manila
San Sebastian College – Recoletos alumni
GMA Network personalities
ABS-CBN personalities
Star Magic personalities